Michele Gammino (born 16 June 1941) is an Italian actor, voice actor and television presenter.

Career
Born in Rome to parents who originated from Palermo, Gammino began his career during the early 1970s. For his work on Italian television, Gammino has become famous on a number of occasions but mostly as presenter of Giochi senza frontiere, the Italian edition of Jeux Sans Frontières, which he co-hosted with Ettore Andenna and Milly Carlucci between 1979 and 1982. He also commentated for Italy at the 1980 Eurovision Song Contest. Gammino continued to act for television, he provided newly restored voices in a series of Italian films which include Le ragazze di Piazza di Spagna, Carabinieri 7, Una donna per amico, Linda e il brigadiere, Un medico in famiglia and the third season of I Cesaroni.

Gammino is probably best known in Italy for his roles in dubbing film into the Italian language. He is the official Italian voice actor of Harrison Ford and Steven Seagal. He has even dubbed over 40 characters in films portrayed by actors such as Kevin Costner, Bill Murray, Jack Nicholson, Chevy Chase, Chazz Palminteri and Bob Hoskins. He also performed the Italian voice of James Bond in The Living Daylights and Licence to Kill which both starred Timothy Dalton as Bond. In Gammino's animated roles, he dubbed the voices of Nando in Asterix and Cleopatra and Eddie Valiant in Who Framed Roger Rabbit. He also became the new voice of Morbo in Futurama after the death of Sandro Sardone in 2009.

Since 2008, Gammino has been a presenter on Rai Radio 2.

Personal life
Gammino is the father of voice actor Roberto Gammino. His niece Letizia Scifoni is also a voice actress.

Filmography

Cinema
Confessions of a Police Captain (1971)
In Prison Awaiting Trial (1971)
Il padrino, come comparsa (1972)
Un ufficiale non si arrende mai nemmeno di fronte all'evidenza, firmato Colonnello Buttiglione (1973)
Commissariato di notturna (1974)
Professore venga accompagnato dai suoi genitori (1974)
Valentina... The Virgin Wife (1975)
Coeds (1975)
Silent Action (1975)
Professor of Natural Sciences (1976)
Taxi Girl (1977)
La soldatessa alla visita militare (1977)
La soldatessa alle grandi manovre (1978)
Desirable Teacher (1981)
Giovani, belle... probabilmente ricche (1982)
Mollo tutto (1996)
Se lo fai sono guai (2001)
Un'estate al mare (2008)
Young Europe (2011)

Dubbing roles

Animation
Dr. Jekyll and Mr. Hyde in The Pagemaster
Nando in Asterix and Cleopatra
Chanticleer in Rock-a-Doodle
Morbo in Futurama (seasons 6-7)
Pa Cop in The Lego Movie
Red in All Dogs Go to Heaven 2
Dr. Waddleton Crutchley in Mickey and the Roadster Racers
Captain Holly in Watership Down
Santa Claus in Arthur Christmas
Fox in The Animals of Farthing Wood
Rooster in The Secret Life of Pets 2

Live action
Indiana Jones in Indiana Jones and the Raiders of the Lost Ark
Indiana Jones in Indiana Jones and the Last Crusade
Indiana Jones in Indiana Jones and the Kingdom of the Crystal Skull
Henry Turner in Regarding Henry
Tom O'Meara in The Devil's Own
Rick Deckard in Blade Runner
Rick Deckard in Blade Runner 2049
President James Marshall in Air Force One
Jack Ryan in Patriot Games
Jack Ryan in Clear and Present Danger
Rozat K. "Rusty" Sabich in Presumed Innocent
Robert Stonehill in Extraordinary Measures
Han Solo in Star Wars: Episode VII - The Force Awakens
Han Solo in Star Wars: Episode IX - The Rise of Skywalker
Max Brogan in Crossing Over
Branch Rickey in 42
Jack Stanfield in Firewall
Richard Walker in Frantic
Richard Kimble in The Fugitive
Linus Larrabee in Sabrina
Quinn Harris in Six Days, Seven Nights
Dutch Van Den Broeck in Random Hearts
Norman Spencer in What Lies Beneath
Alexei Vostrikov in K-19: The Widowmaker
Joe Gavilan in Hollywood Homicide
Jock Goddard in Paranoia
Hyrum Graff in Ender's Game
Mack Tannen in Anchorman 2: The Legend Continues
Max Drummer in The Expendables 3
William Jones in The Age of Adaline
John Thornton in The Call of the Wild
Harrison Ford in Jimmy Hollywood
Harrison Ford in Brüno
Casey Ryback in Under Siege
Casey Ryback in Under Siege 2: Dark Territory
Robert 'Bobby' Samuels in Born to Raise Hell
Shane Daniels in A Dangerous Man
Forrest Taft in On Deadly Ground
Jack Taggert in Fire Down Below
Wesley McClaren in The Patriot
Austin Travis in Executive Decision
Jack Cole in The Glimmer Man
Orin Boyd in Exit Wounds
Sasha Petrosevitch in Half Past Dead
Jack Foster in Shadow Man
Marshall Lawson in Attack Force
John Sands in Flight of Fury
Simon Ballister in Urban Justice
Ruslan Drachev in Driven to Kill
Tao in Against the Dark
Rolland Sallinger in The Keeper
Rogelio Torrez in Machete
Elijah Kane in True Justice
The Mariner in Waterworld
John J. Dunbar in Dances with Wolves
Gardner Barnes in Fandango
Jim Garrison in JFK
Frank Farmer in The Bodyguard
Robert "Butch" Haynes in A Perfect World
Wyatt Earp in Wyatt Earp
Stephen Simmons in The War
Roy McAvoy in Tin Cup
The Postman in The Postman
Garrett Blake in Message in a Bottle
Billy Chapel in For Love of the Game
Thomas J. Murphy in 3000 Miles to Graceland
Denny Davies in The Upside of Anger
Beau Burroughs in Rumor Has It
Ben Randall in The Guardian
Jonathan Kent in Man of Steel
Jonathan Kent in Batman v Superman: Dawn of Justice
Ethan Renner in 3 Days to Kill
Elliot Anderson in Black or White
Larry Bloom in Molly's Game
Frank Hamer in The Highwaymen
Eddie Valiant in Who Framed Roger Rabbit
Smee in Hook
Gus Klein in Shattered
Jack Moony in Heart Condition
Mario Mario in Super Mario Bros.
J. Edgar Hoover in Nixon
Bart in Unleashed
Bill Nelson in Doomsday
James Bond in The Living Daylights
James Bond in Licence to Kill
Neville Sinclair in The Rocketeer
Chief Inspector Jones in The Tourist
Henry Lloyd South in Goin' South
Frank Chambers in The Postman Always Rings Twice
Eugene O'Neill in Reds
Charlie Smith in The Border
Jack Nicholson in Terror in the Aisles
Nathan R. Jessup in A Few Good Men
Will Randall in Wolf
Melvin Udall in As Good as It Gets
Warren R. Schmidt in About Schmidt
Buddy Rydell in Anger Management
Edward Cole in The Bucket List
Charles Madison in How Do You Know
Grimm in Quick Change
Bob Wiley in What About Bob?
Phil Connors in Groundhog Day
Frank Milo in Mad Dog and Glory
Jack Corcoran in Larger Than Life
Wallace Ritchie in The Man Who Knew Too Little
Kenneth Bowden in Wild Things
Herman Blume in Rushmore
Tommy Crickshaw in Cradle Will Rock
John Bosley in Charlie's Angels
The Writer in The Lost City
Agent 13 in Get Smart
Irwin Fletcher in Fletch
Clark Griswold in National Lampoon's European Vacation
Clark Griswold in Vacation
Emmett Fitz-Hume in Spies Like Us
Andy Farmer in Funny Farm
Deke in Hero
Nick Halloway in Memoirs of an Invisible Man
Ed Grant in Zoom
Al Hart in The Last Laugh
Sonny in A Bronx Tale
Elleroy Coolidge in Mulholland Falls
Tony in Faithful
Ricky in The Last Word
John Pirelli in The Perez Family
Walken in Little Man
Eddie Jillette in No Mercy
Frank Roberts Jr. in Miles from Home
Edward Lewis in Pretty Woman
Mr. Jones in Mr. Jones
Lancelot in First Knight
Homer Eisenhower Graham in Runaway Bride
Jeff Hendricks in Jaws
Jeff Hendricks in Jaws 2
Basil Exposition in Austin Powers: The Spy Who Shagged Me
Basil Exposition in Austin Powers in Goldmember
Paulie Cicero in Goodfellas
Graham Crockett in Bulworth
Gino Barberini in Mambo Italiano
Vernon Scott in Rules Don't Apply
Viktor in Underworld
Viktor in Underworld: Evolution
Viktor in Underworld: Rise of the Lycans
Apollo Creed in Rocky IV
Jericho "Action" Jackson in Action Jackson
Abraham Whistler in Blade
Harvey Shine in Last Chance Harvey
Jeor Mormont in Game of Thrones
Sam Adekunle in A Good Man in Africa
Chappy Sinclair in Iron Eagle
Dean Edward Parker in Toy Soldiers
Leo Porter in Firewalker
Howard Mierzwiak in Eternal Sunshine of the Spotless Mind
Father Richard Moore in The Exorcism of Emily Rose
Stephen in The Last Kiss
James Reid in The Green Hornet
Reverdy Johnson in The Conspirator
Author in The Grand Budapest Hotel
Judge Turpin in Sweeney Todd: The Demon Barber of Fleet Street
Carlo Rizzi in The Godfather
Robert Muldoon in Jurassic Park

Video games
Indiana Jones in Indiana Jones and the Infernal Machine
Peter Venkman in Ghostbusters: The Video Game
Ray McCoy in Blade Runner

References

External links

 
 
 

1941 births
Living people
Male actors from Rome
People of Sicilian descent
Italian male film actors
Italian male television actors
Italian male voice actors
Italian male radio actors
Italian male stage actors
Italian male video game actors
Italian television presenters
Italian radio presenters
Italian voice directors
20th-century Italian male actors
21st-century Italian male actors